Ali Hazelwood is the pen name of an Italian neuroscience professor and writer of romance novels. Her stories center around women in STEM fields and academia. Her debut novel, The Love Hypothesis, was a New York Times best seller.

Career
Hazelwood wrote The Love Hypothesis after a literary agent contacted her about her online fanfiction.

In 2022 she published three novellas: Under One Roof, Stuck with You, and Below Zero. These stories were compiled into a book called Loathe to Love You (2023).

Her second novel Love on the Brain was published on August 23, 2022. She has a third book forthcoming in 2023 called Love, Theoretically.

Personal life 
Hazelwood was born and raised in Italy and lived in Japan and Germany before moving to the United States to pursue her Ph.D. in neuroscience. During her graduate study, Hazelwood researched brain simulation and cognitive neuroscience.

Hazelwood currently works full-time as a professor. She has a husband and two cats.

Works

Novels 
 The Love Hypothesis (2021)
 Love on the Brain (2022)
 Love, Theoretically (2023)
 Check & Mate (2023)

Novellas 
 Loathe to Love You (2023)
 Under One Roof (2022)
 Stuck with You (2022)
 Below Zero (2022)

References

External links
 Official website

Year of birth missing (living people)
Living people
21st-century Italian women writers
Italian women neuroscientists
Italian romantic fiction writers
Women romantic fiction writers